Pietro Pensa (Esino Lario, 1906 – Bellano, 1996) was an Italian civil engineer and historian, who served as mayor of Esino Lario.

He contributed scholarly work about the history, culture and environment around Lake Como mainly featuring Valsassina, Lecco and Esino Lario.

Bibliography 

 , 2007. .
 Eugenio Pesci, Grigne for ever in "Alp", n. 247, 11/2007, pp. 54–61.
 Carlo Maria Pensa, Pietro Pensa raccontato dal figlio Carlo Maria in Pietro Pensa in L'adda, il nostro fiume, volume III, edizioni cultura "il punto stampa", c-b-r-s. editrice Lecco, 1997, pp. 9–15.
  in "", n. 40, 25 October 1996.
  in "", November 1996, p. 7.
 , in Asfat, Anno II, n.4, December 1997.
  in "Corriere della Provincia", 11/07/1988.
 , in Lecco 2000, Lecco gennaio 1998.

External links 

 

1906 births
1996 deaths
20th-century Italian engineers
20th-century  Italian historians